Ganga Prasad Pradhan (Newar: गंगा प्रसाद प्रधान) was born on July 4, 1851 in Kathmandu and was the first ordained Nepali Christian pastor, main translator of the Nepali Bible, co-author of an English-Nepali dictionary and author of children's textbooks.

He was born to a wealthy Newari family and taught by Scottish missionaries in Darjeeling. He returned to Kathmandu with aims of starting educational institutions for the public, as education was available to only a handful. He was exiled permanently to India in 1914 by Rana government for preaching.

He was also editor of Gorkhey Khabar Kagat a monthly magazine, from 1901 to his death in 1932.

References

interwiki - Newari language article: :new:गोर्खे खवर कागत् (पत्रिका) "Gorkhey Khabar Kagat (magazine)"

Bible translators
1851 births
1932 deaths
People from Kathmandu
Nepalese translators
Translators to Nepali
Nepalese Christians
Newar people
Nepalese exiles
Nepalese Christian clergy